The 2016 Irish general election took place on Friday 26 February to elect 158 Teachtaí Dála (TDs) across 40 constituencies to Dáil Éireann, the lower house of the Oireachtas, Ireland's parliament. The 31st Dáil was dissolved by President Michael D. Higgins on 3 February, at the request of Taoiseach Enda Kenny. There was a reduction of eight seats under the Electoral (Amendment) (Dáil Constituencies) Act 2013.

Following the election, Kenny's Fine Gael with 50 of the 158 seats available remained the largest party in the Dáil despite having lost 26 seats. The main opposition party Fianna Fáil, which had suffered its worst-ever election result of 20 seats in 2011, increased its seats to 44. Sinn Féin was expected to make gains, encouraged by opinion polls placing it ahead of Fianna Fáil, and it became the third-most numerous party with 23 deputies. The Labour Party, which had been the junior party in coalition government with Fine Gael and which had returned its best-ever showing of 37 seats in 2011, fell to just seven deputies, its lowest-ever share of Dáil seats. Smaller parties and independent politicians made up the remaining 34 seats.

The 32nd Dáil met on 10 March and elected a new Ceann Comhairle, the first to be elected by secret ballot, which was won by Seán Ó Fearghaíl of Fianna Fáil. The Dáil proceeded to the nomination of Taoiseach, but no candidate received a majority. Kenny formally resigned as Taoiseach that same day, but remained in office as a caretaker until a new government was formed. Kenny sought an agreement with Fianna Fáil to form a government, and negotiations continued through most of April. An agreement was finally reached for a Fine Gael-led minority government on 29 April, 63 days after the election, and the Dáil formally re-elected Kenny as Taoiseach on 6 May. Kenny is the first Taoiseach from Fine Gael to win re-election.

Following the introduction of gender quotas, a record 35 seats were filled by women, bringing the proportion of women in the Dáil to 22 percent, up from 15 percent after the previous general election.

Background
The outgoing government was a Fine Gael–Labour Party coalition led by Taoiseach Enda Kenny and Tánaiste Joan Burton. Fianna Fáil, Sinn Féin, Anti-Austerity Alliance–People Before Profit, Renua Ireland, Social Democrats, Workers and Unemployed Action, and independent non-party TDs formed the opposition in the Dáil. The government was formed on 9 March 2011, the first day of the 31st Dáil elected on 25 February 2011.

Whereas the Constitution gives the Taoiseach authority to dissolve the Dáil, under electoral law the precise date of polling is specified by the Minister for the Environment, who was Alan Kelly of Labour. Electoral law required the 31st Dáil to be dissolved by 9 March 2016. Kenny rejected predictions in October 2015 that he would call an election in November to capitalise on rising Fine Gael support. In January 2016, media reported that Fine Gael and Labour respectively favoured Thursday 25 and Friday 26 February 2016 as the election date; Friday would facilitate voting by students registered to vote at their family home.

After a cabinet meeting on 2 February, Kenny announced that he would be seeking a dissolution the following day. At 09:30 on 3 February he formally told the Dáil this, and that the new Dáil would meet on 10 March; the Dáil was adjourned without statements from the opposition. At 09:58 while Kenny was en route to Áras an Uachtaráin to meet the President, the election date of 26 February was confirmed from his Twitter account. At 10:35 the President issued the proclamation dissolving the Dáil. Later that day, Minister Kelly signed the order setting the polling day. The writs of election are issued by the clerk of the Dáil.

New parties and alliances
A number of parties and political alliances were formed during the lifespan of the 31st Dáil in order to contest the election:

On 14 March 2014, the Independents for Equality Movement was registered as a political party by non-party TDs in advance of the 2014 local elections. Founded by Wexford TD Mick Wallace, it was renamed Independents 4 Change in October 2015. By the time the 31st Dáil was dissolved it counted among its members Wallace, Joan Collins, Clare Daly and Tommy Broughan, but all remained listed on the Dáil register as independent members of the house. All four members as well as one other councillor entered the election as Independents 4 Change candidates.
On 13 March 2015, Renua Ireland was founded by TDs and a Senator who had been expelled from the Fine Gael parliamentary party in 2013 for voting against the Protection of Life During Pregnancy Bill on anti-abortion grounds. Lucinda Creighton led this party into the election.
On 30 March 2015, the Independent Alliance was formed by non-party TDs and founded by Shane Ross and Michael Fitzmaurice. It was not a political party, and stated that it would not impose a whip except where the group had agreed to support a government on confidence motions.
On 15 July 2015, the Social Democrats were founded by Róisín Shortall, elected to the 31st Dáil as a Labour Party TD; Catherine Murphy, who was also a member of the Labour Party until 2003 but was elected to the 31st Dáil as an independent non-party TD, and Stephen Donnelly who was elected to the 31st Dáil as an independent non-party TD. All three entered the election as co-leaders of the Social Democrats.
In August 2015, Right2Change was launched as a broad political campaigning platform based on the Right2Water campaign that had been ongoing since 2014 against the introduction of water charges in Ireland. Right2Change produced a document of policy principles for "a progressive Irish government" and promoted a vote transfer pact, to which several bodies subscribed in advance of the 2016 election, including Sinn Féin, the People Before Profit Alliance, Workers and Unemployed Action, Direct Democracy Ireland, the Communist Party of Ireland; the individual TDs Joan Collins, Clare Daly, Thomas Pringle, Tommy Broughan and Mick Wallace; and the trade unions Unite the Union, the Communication Workers Union, and Mandate.
On 6 October 2015, the Anti-Austerity Alliance–People Before Profit were founded as a registered party, to serve as an electoral alliance of the Anti-Austerity Alliance and the People Before Profit Alliance. They had contested the 2011 general election as separate parties, as the Socialist Party and the People Before Profit Alliance respectively, under the joint platform of the United Left Alliance (which had included the Workers and Unemployed Action Group and left wing independent politicians).

Gender quotas
Part 6 of the Electoral (Amendment) (Political Funding) Act 2012 provides that parties will lose half of their state funding unless at least 30% of their candidates at the election are female and at least 30% are male. All parties except Direct Democracy Ireland fulfilled this condition. This contributed in part to the highest percentage of women elected to the Dáil; at 35 TDs, this was 22% of the 158 TDs, an increase from 15% at the previous general election.

Electoral system

Ireland uses proportional representation with a single transferable vote (PR–STV). The general election took place throughout the state to elect 158 members of Dáil Éireann, a reduction of 8 from the previous 166 members. This follows the passage of the Electoral (Amendment) (Dáil Constituencies) Act 2013. The Ceann Comhairle (speaker of the lower house of parliament) is automatically re-elected unless he opts to retire from the Dáil. The election was held in 40 parliamentary constituencies. Each multi-member constituency elects three, four or five Teachtaí Dála (Dáil deputies, lit. Assembly Deputies).

The closing date for nominations was 11 February 2016. A total of 551 candidates contested the election, slightly down from the 566 that took part in the 2011 general election, a record figure. The number of candidates for each party was: Fine Gael (88), Fianna Fáil (71), Sinn Féin (50), Green Party (40), Labour Party (36), Anti-Austerity Alliance–People Before Profit (31, of which 18 People Before Profit Alliance and 13 Anti-Austerity Alliance), Renua Ireland (26), Direct Democracy Ireland (19), Social Democrats (14), Independents 4 Change (5), Workers' Party (5), Catholic Democrats (3), Fís Nua (2), Irish Democratic Party (1), Communist Party of Ireland (1). Among the 159 independent candidates and others running without a party platform were 21 independents affiliated to the Independent Alliance, 19 independents affiliated to Right2Change, and the outgoing TD Séamus Healy, who was nominated as a non-party candidate for this election. Voting took place between 07:00 and 22:00 (WET).

Islands off the coast of Donegal, Mayo, and Galway voted one day earlier. All resident Irish and British citizens were eligible to be on the Dáil electoral register. The 2016–17 register was published on 1 February by the local authorities, who were responsible for maintaining it. Applications for the supplementary register for the general election closed on 9 February, with 30,185 names added.

Retiring incumbents
The following members of the 31st Dáil announced in advance of the poll that they would not be seeking re-election:

Campaign

The campaign officially began after the dissolution of Dáil Éireann on 3 February 2016 and lasted until polling day on 26 February 2016. During the campaign, official election posters are permitted in locations which would otherwise constitute litter; some candidates were reported to have illegally erected posters too soon.  The Broadcasting Authority of Ireland's moratorium on election coverage lasted from 14:00 on 25 February 2016 until polls had closed.

Party manifestos and slogans

Television debates
RTÉ set a minimum of three TDs for a party to be invited to its 15 February debate. The Green Party, which had no TDs (having lost them all in 2011), took an unsuccessful High Court case against the exclusion of its leader Eamon Ryan. An Irish language debate, moderated by Eimear Ní Chonaola was to be broadcast on TG4 on 17 February, but was cancelled due to the weak proficiency in that language of Adams and Burton. Aodhán Ó Ríordáin (Labour) and Pearse Doherty (Sinn Féin) were suggested as fluent replacements, but Fianna Fáil and Fine Gael insisted that a leaders' debate should be confined to party leaders only. TG4 instead broadcast successive one-to-one interviews with each party's representative. There was also a "live audience discussion" on RTÉ Two on 21 February featuring Timmy Dooley (FF), Mary Lou McDonald (SF), Aodhán Ó Ríordáin (Labour), Averil Power (non-party), Eamon Ryan (Greens), Leo Varadkar (FG), and Adrienne Wallace (AAA-PBP). The discussion was hosted by Keelin Shanley at Facebook's Dublin office and featured questions submitted via Facebook and Twitter. There was some controversy surrounding this debate as a representative of special needs parents said she was to appear to ask a question on waiting lists only to be told by RTÉ later that the topic would not be covered.

Opinion polls

Results

Counting of votes began at 09:00 UTC on Saturday 27 February 2016 and continued over the course of the weekend and into the following week, with the final two seats, in Longford–Westmeath, announced after multiple recounts at 05:30 UTC on Thursday 3 March.	

It was Fine Gael's lowest number of seats since the 2002 general election, the election that led to Kenny becoming leader (the outgoing finance minister in 2016, Michael Noonan, had been Fine Gael's leader in 2002.) They performed especially poorly outside Dublin, dropping from 59 seats to 36; in Dublin the party fared better, going from 17 to 14 for a net loss of only three. Indeed, Fine Gael became the largest party in the capital for the first time since November 1982, and won seats in every constituency in Dublin for the first time since 1987. Fianna Fáil more than doubled the number of seats that they had coming into the election. Having been without representation in Dublin since the death of Brian Lenihan in 2011, Fianna Fáil managed to win six seats in the capital this time. Sinn Féin recorded their strongest showing under Adams to become the third party, making gains in Leinster and in urban areas of Munster, mostly at the expense of the Labour Party. Labour won their lowest vote share since 1987, and their lowest share of seats ever. Despite speculation that she would lose her seat, Joan Burton became the first sitting Tánaiste to avoid defeat at a general election since Mary Harney in 2002. Labour's vote collapse meant that not until the Longford–Westmeath result did they reach the seven-seat threshold to qualify as a parliamentary group with full speaking rights under current Dáil rules.

The combined vote of 49.8 per cent for Fine Gael and Fianna Fáil was a record low for the two largest parties in the Dáil, eclipsing the previous record of 53.6 per cent set by Cumann na nGaedheal and Fianna Fáil in June 1927. It was the first time the vote for Ireland's two traditionally dominant parties had fallen below 50 per cent in a general election. Fine Gael became the largest party in the Dáil with just 25.5 per cent of the vote, the lowest percentage ever for a first party.

Voting summary

Seats summary

TDs who lost their seats

Government formation

Enda Kenny immediately conceded that the outgoing coalition government of Fine Gael and Labour would be unable to continue. Fine Gael was 29 seats short of a majority, leading to speculation of a possibility of a grand coalition between Fine Gael and Fianna Fáil, of a minority government, or of another general election later in 2016. Talks to form a government got underway in March.

On 29 April, after 63 days of negotiation and three failed votes for Taoiseach, Fine Gael and Fianna Fáil reached an agreement about a Fine Gael minority government. In the days following, Fine Gael negotiated a deal with Independent TDs on the formation of a minority coalition. Enda Kenny was re-elected Taoiseach on 6 May 2016.

Notes, citations and sources

Footnotes

References

Further reading
 
 Culloty, Eileen, and Jane Suiter. "Journalism Norms and the Absence of Media Populism in the Irish General Election 2016." in Mediated Campaigns and Populism in Europe (Palgrave Macmillan, Cham, 2019) pp. 51–74.

External links

 Election 2016 news coverage at Raidió Teilifís Éireann
 Election 2016 news coverage at The Irish Times
 Election 2016 news coverage at the  Irish Independent

 

 
General
General
2016
RTÉ controversies
32nd Dáil
February 2016 events in Ireland